Borys Stepanovych Oliynyk (23 June 1934 – 1 October 1999) was a Ukrainian political figure and merited rail transport worker.

Biography
Borys Oliynyk was born in a village in historical region of Podillya on territory of the modern Khmelnytskyi Oblast, which at that time was part of Vinnytsia Oblast.

Borys Oliynyk started his professional career soon after graduating from the Dnipropetrovsk National University of Rail Transport as a railway engineer in 1957.

In 1957 he worked as a yardmaster at a train station in Mohyliv-Podilskyi and next year as a director of various other train station of the Zhmerynka department of Southwestern Railway. In 1965-1976 Oliynyk headed a number of regional departments of Southweastern Railway in Hraivoron and Konotop. Since 1976 he served as a top official of Southwestern Railway.

While being a director of the Southwestern Railway, in 1991 he was appointed to the newly established the State Administration of Rail Transport of Ukraine (today known as Ukrzaliznytsia) just before the dissolution of the Soviet Union. During its reorganization Oliynyk refused to continue be in charge of Ukrzaliznytsia and was replaced in August 1993. He continued to be the chief officer of the Southwestern Railway.

In 1957-1991 Oliynyk was a member of the Communist Party of Ukraine, and since 1981 he was a candidate member of the Central Committee of the party. In 1981-1994 he also was a People's Deputy of Ukraine in Verkhovna Rada and attempted to run for parliament in 1998.

On 1 October 1999 Oliynyk was shot two steps away from his own apartment along with his driver Volodymyr Nechai. It was one of the biggest politically motivated unsolved murders of 1999. Shortly after the murder, Ukrainian law enforcement called it a "matter of honor" to solve the crime.

The People's Deputy of Ukraine Anatoliy Yermak announced that the murder was connected with money laundering of Russian funds in the Bank of New York.

Gallery

See also
 Vadym Hetman
 Georgiy Gongadze
 Pavel Sheremet
 Vyacheslav Chornovil

Notes

References

External links
 Borys Oliynyk at the Official Ukraine Today portal

1934 births
1999 deaths
1999 murders in Ukraine
People from Khmelnytskyi Oblast
Ukrainian railway mechanical engineers
Communist Party of Ukraine politicians
Tenth convocation members of the Verkhovna Rada of the Ukrainian Soviet Socialist Republic
Eleventh convocation members of the Verkhovna Rada of the Ukrainian Soviet Socialist Republic
First convocation members of the Verkhovna Rada
Ukrainian murder victims
Deaths by firearm in Ukraine
People murdered in Ukraine
Ukrainian Railways
Southwestern Railways